Stade Louis II was a multi-use stadium in Fontvieille, Monaco. It was initially used as the stadium of AS Monaco FC matches. It was rebuilt and replaced by a new Stade Louis II in 1985. The capacity of the stadium was 12,000 spectators.

In 1936, Prince Louis II of Monaco awarded Jean-Baptiste Pastor and his company J.B. Pastor & Fils, the commission to build the country's first football stadium. It was finished in 1939.

The stadium hosted major professional boxing world title and non title fights from time to time; those include the Carlos Monzon versus Nino Benvenuti rematch, Monzon's rematch with Emile Griffith, Monzon's two classic fights with Rodrigo Valdes, Davey Moore versus Wilfredo Benitez, and the double knockout-ending classic between Lee Roy Murphy and Chisanda Mutti (won by Murphy), Other major fights have been held at the similarly named Stade Louis II.

References

Defunct football venues in Monaco
AS Monaco FC
1939 establishments in Monaco